Giorgio Stivanello (13 July 1932 in Venice – 18 May 2010) was an Italian professional football player.

His son Piero Stivanello played football professionally.

Honours
 Serie A champion: 1957/58, 1959/60, 1960/61.
 Coppa Italia winner: 1958/59, 1959/60.

External links
 Career summary by playerhistory.com

1932 births
Italian footballers
Serie A players
Venezia F.C. players
Calcio Padova players
Juventus F.C. players
2010 deaths
Association football forwards